The Steganinae Hendel, 1917, is the smaller of two subfamilies in the fruit fly family Drosophilidae. The other subfamily is the Drosophilinae.

Diagnosis 

The subfamily is monophyletic (Grimaldi 1990; Sidorenko 2002), but can not be characterised by a single morphological character that distinguishes this subfamily from the Drosophilinae. See for a discussion on this subfamily "Drosophila: A Laboratory Handbook" by M. Ashburner, S. Hawley, K. Golic (not reproduced here due to copyrights).

 D. A. Grimaldi 1990. A phylogenetic, revised classification of genera in the Drosophilidae (Diptera). Bulletin of the American Museum of Natural History 197: 1-128.
 V. S. Sidorenko 2002. Phylogeny of the tribe Steganini Hendel and some related taxa (Diptera, Drosophilidae). Far Eastern Entomologist 111: 1-20.

Phylogeny 

The phylogenetic relationships within the subfamily have not yet been confirmed by molecular studies, and are partially based on traditional cladistic methods using primarily morphological characteristics and partly based on expert opinions. The classification below might be not approved by all scholars in the field, but gives a reasonable overview of our current knowledge:

Tribe: Steganini
Subtribe: Steganina
Genus: Eostegana
Genus: Stegana

Subtribe: Leucophengina
Genus: Allopygaea
Genus: Cacoxenus 
Genus: Leucophenga

Tribe: Gitonini
Subtribe: Gitonina
Genus: Amiota
Genus: Apenthecia
Genus: Apsiphortica
Genus: Cacoxenus
Genus: Crincosia
Genus: Erima
Genus: Gitona
Genus: Paraleucophenga
Genus: Paraphortica
Genus: Phortica

Subtribe: Acletoxenina
Genus: Acletoxenus
Genus: Hyalistata
Genus: Mayagueza
Genus: Pseudiastata
Genus: Rhinoleucophenga
Genus: Trachyleucophenga

Subtribe unknown
Genus: Electrophortica
Genus: Pararhinoleucophenga
Genus: Parastegana
Genus: Pseudostegana

Tribe unknown
Genus: Soederbomia
Genus: Pyrgometopa

For species within the various genera, see fix   Taxodros

References

Drosophilidae
Articles containing video clips
Brachycera subfamilies